Kudva is a village in Uttar Pradesh, India. It may also relate to:

Vaman Srinivas Kudva, the founding director of Syndicate Bank in India